General Sosthène Fernandez (born on 28 November 1923 in Phnom Penh; died 2006 in France) was the Commander-in-Chief of the Khmer National Armed Forces (FANK) and chief of general staff of the Khmer Republic after Prince Sihanouk was deposed as head of state in 1970. Prior to 1970, he was a prominent politician and a former chief of the police.

Life and career
General Fernandez  was born in Phnom Penh to a Filipino father and an ethnic Khmer mother born in Vietnam.

His father briefly joined the teaching service and was naturalised as a French subject in 1915 and took up law studies, and by 1928 was appointed as a local magistrate. In the 1940s, he co-founded the Liberal Party along with Prince Norindeth, and was elected to parliament in 1951 and served under various ministry portfolios in the 1950s and 1960s.

In the 1960s Colonel Fernandez served as Secretary of State for National Security.

In 1975, because of the cutting of US aid, the republican government's leaders wanted to stop the war unconditionally. However, Fernandez refused to negotiate with the Khmer Rouge if the government ordered FANK to lay down their arms during the negotiation; for this reason, he resigned as army chief. Fernandez and Lon Nol left the country before the Khmer Rouge took Phnom Penh in 1975. All the republicans wanted to stop the Civil War in Cambodia. Several others officials such as Long Boret, Lon Non and Prince Sisowath Sirik Matak remained in office until the Khmer Rouge captured Phnom Penh on April 17, 1975. Did they mistakenly think that they would be spared through the intercession of Norodom Sihanouk?  On the contrary, the reality was  they were executed by the Khmer Rouge.

In 1998, General Fernandez returned to Cambodia to meet his former soldiers. He wrote a book about his life as the Commander-in-Chief of the Khmer National Armed Force.

He left the country to become a roving ambassador.

He died in France in 2006 due to complications from diabetes.

References

Bibliography

 Mémoires of General Sosthène Fernandez : "mémoires d'une guerre oubliée" site amazone.fr, Book published in mars 2015
 https://www.youtube.com/watch?v=5t4vARn-s7g
 
 Preston, Paul et al. British documents on foreign affairs: reports and papers from the Foreign Office confidential print. From 1951 through 1956. Asia, 1951-1956, Volume 5, LexisNexis, 2007,

Further reading

United States: Senate and congress
https://reuters.screenocean.com/record/1066060 joint conference commander in chief with the Prime Minister

1923 births
2006 deaths
Cambodian anti-communists
Cambodian exiles
Cambodian generals
Cambodian Roman Catholics
Khmer Krom people
Cambodian people of Filipino descent
People from Phnom Penh
People of the Vietnam War